This is a list of adult nonfiction books that topped The New York Times Nonfiction Best Seller list in 1973.

See also

 New York Times Fiction Best Sellers of 1973
 1973 in literature
 Lists of The New York Times Nonfiction Best Sellers
 Publishers Weekly list of bestselling novels in the United States in the 1970s

References

1973
.
1973 in the United States